"Black and White" is a song by Irish singer Niall Horan from his second studio album Heartbreak Weather (2020), which it appears as the album's second track. The song additionally serves as the album's fourth single, being released on 21 April 2020.

Composition
Musically, "Black and White" has been described as a pop rock ballad. The song was compared to the works of Ed Sheeran and Horan's former band One Direction. Lyrically, it is "a soaring declaration of eternal devotion" with visions of a wedding day and golden hour. In terms of music notation, "Black and White" was composed using  common time in the key of D major, with a tempo of 148 beats per minute. Horan's vocal range spans from the low note A2 to the high note of D5 (in the backing).

Live performances
Horan first performed the song on The Late Late Show with James Corden on 13 March 2020. Horan also performed the song on 18 April 2020 on the Lady Gaga-curated One World: Together At Home television special, a benefit event by Global Citizen to raise funds for the World Health Organization's COVID-19 Solidarity Response Fund.

Credits and personnel
Credits adapted from Tidal.

 Niall Horan – songwriting, vocals, backing vocals
 Julian Bunetta – production, songwriting, drums, guitar, piano
 Teddy Geiger – production, songwriting, guitar, programming
 Alexander Izquierdo – songwriting
 Scott Harris – songwriting
 Nate Mercereau – bass, guitar
 Erynn Hill – A&R
 Elizabeth Isik – A&R admin
 Mark "Spike" Stent – mixing, studio personnel
 Mike Wolach – assistant mixing, studio personnel
 Michael Freeman – assistant mixing, studio personnel
 Chris Gehringer – mastering, studio personnel
 Will Quinnell – assistant mastering engineering, studio personnel

Charts

Certifications

Release history

References

2020 singles
2020 songs
Niall Horan songs
Songs written by Niall Horan
Songs written by Julian Bunetta
Songs written by Teddy Geiger
Songs written by Eskeerdo
Songs written by Scott Harris (songwriter)